Victoria Lynn Hayden, known as Torey L. Hayden (born 21 May 1951 in Livingston, Montana, U.S.), is a special education teacher, university lecturer and writer of non-fiction books based on her real-life experiences with teaching and counseling children with special needs and also of fiction books.

Subjects covered in her books include autism, Tourette syndrome, sexual abuse, fetal alcohol syndrome, and elective mutism (now called selective mutism), her specialty.

Biography 
Hayden attended high school in Billings, Montana and graduated in 1969. She attended Whitman College in Walla Walla, Washington. She received a master's degree in special education from Montana State University Billings in 1975 and moved to University of Minnesota in Minneapolis for a doctorate in educational psychology. While there, she also worked with the Department of Child and Adolescent Psychiatry in the university hospitals.

Hayden moved to Wales in 1980 and married a Scotsman named Ken in 1982. In 1985 they had a daughter (Sheena). Hayden is divorced.

In Wales Hayden has worked primarily with charities associated with child neglect and abuse, including Childline, the NSPCC, the Samaritans and the Citizens' Advice Bureau.

She has written five books of fiction in addition to her non-fiction books (see below).

Works

Non-fiction 
 The Kid That Didn´t Want To Talk (1980)
 One Child (1980)
 Somebody Else’s Kids (1981)
 Murphy’s Boy (1983) / Silent Boy  (British title for Murphy's Boy)
 Just Another Kid (1988)
 Ghost Girl (1991)
 The Tiger’s Child (1995)
 Beautiful Child (2002)
 Twilight Children (2005)
 Lost Child (2019)
 The Invisible Girl (2021)

Fiction 
 The Sunflower Forest (1984)
 The Mechanical Cat (1998) / Overheard In A Dream (English title for The Mechanical Cat)
 The Very Worst Thing (2003)
 Innocent Foxes (2011) (In UK)

References 

1951 births
American expatriates in the United Kingdom
Autism activists
Child psychologists
Living people
People from Livingston, Montana
University of Minnesota College of Education and Human Development alumni
Whitman College alumni
National Society for the Prevention of Cruelty to Children people

es:Ghost Girl